Vincenzo Silvestro (born 31 July 1998) is an Italian football player who plays as a midfielder for  club Mantova.

Club career

Bologna

Loan to Pordenone 
On 19 July 2017, Silvestro was signed by Serie C side Pordenone on a season-long loan deal. On 30 July he made his professional debut as a substitute replacing Sergio Sincu in the 48th minute of a 2–0 home win over Matelica in the first round of Coppa Italia. One week later, on 6 August, he played in the second round in a 2–1 away win over Venezia. On 3 September he made his Serie C debut for Pordenone as a substitute replacing Luca Lulli in the 81st minute of a 3–1 home win over Südtirol. On 5 November he was sent off, as a substitute, with a red card in the 90th minute of a 4–2 home defeat against Triestina. Silvestro ended his season-long loan to Pordenone with only 8 appearances, all as a substitute.

Mantova 
On 11 July 2018, Sivestro joined Serie D side Mantova for an undisclosed fee.

Verona

Loan to Rimini
On 12 July 2019 he was bought by Serie A club Verona and immediately loaned to Serie C side Rimini.

Return to Mantova
On 11 August 2020 he returned to Mantova.

Career statistics

Club

References

External links
 

1998 births
Living people
Footballers from Bologna
Italian footballers
Association football midfielders
Serie C players
Serie D players
Bologna F.C. 1909 players
Pordenone Calcio players
Mantova 1911 players
Hellas Verona F.C. players
Rimini F.C. 1912 players